He Zilin (born 30 July 1998) is a Chinese footballer who currently plays for Chinese Super League side Guangzhou R&F.

Club career
He Zilin started his professional football career in August 2016 when he joined Hong Kong Premier League side R&F, which was the satellite team of Chinese Super League side Guangzhou R&F. On 9 February 2017, he made his senior debut in a 6–1 away loss to Eastern Long Lions.

Career statistics
.

References

External links 
何子霖 at Hkfa.com

1998 births
Living people
Association football defenders
Chinese footballers
R&F (Hong Kong) players
Footballers from Guangzhou
Hong Kong Premier League players
21st-century Chinese people